Sam Hurwitz is a writer, producer, director, and author with credits concerning the areas of film, television, and publishing.

His company, Hurwitz Creative, is a film marketing and bonus feature production company. As a theatrical marketing and home entertainment content group, Hurwitz Creative has made contributions to 300 film titles. Their credits include: Tim Burton's Alice in Wonderland, The Hunger Games, The Nightmare Before Christmas, Ed Wood, Charlie and the Chocolate Factory, Dark Shadows, Frankenweenie, Pixar's Ratatouille, The Incredibles, Brave, Lucasfilm's Star Wars: Episode II – Attack of the Clones, The Chronicles of Narnia: The Voyage of the Dawn Treader, and Avatar.

Television credits 

In television, Sam serves as the Executive Producer of Twentieth Century Fox's TV series Making A Scene, Director and Producer of Fox's critically acclaimed series Fox Legacy with Tom Rothman, and Director of thirteen episodes of Discovery Channel's award winning documentary series Sail Away.

Television specials include Executive Producer of Pixar's 20th Anniversary Special for ABC and Lucasfilm's Star Wars: Connections for Fox.

Film credits 

In feature films, Sam directed United Artist's On the Make, produced the independent film Dead Stop, Second Unit Director of Inside Monkey Zetterland and The Brave starring Marlon Brando and Johnny Depp.

His credits in short films include Writer, Producer, and Director of the Robert Downey Jr. short Deadwait, A Life in The Day starring Charlie Sheen, Comicitis with Charlie Sheen, Whoopi Goldberg and Susan Dey, and the award winning Another Flush, which garnered official selections and/or awards in eight film festivals worldwide.

Additional credits include: Producer of Johnny Depp's Every Cake Neil, Mirror Man, Behind the Terror: A Comedy, Broken August and Executive Producer of the 3D short, The Double.

Sam has produced and/or directed several music videos including Miley Cyrus "I Thought I Lost You," U2's "United Colors of Plutonium," and Vanessa Paradis "Pourtant."

Additional credits include music videos for artists such as The Brian Setzer Orchestra, Color Me Badd, and Raven-Symoné.

Published works 

Published books include the autobiographical Hair Loss: The Best Thing That Ever Happened To Me and Hooray For Doody!

Personal life 

Sam Hurwitz is the son of writer, producer & director Harry Hurwitz.

References

Sam Hurwitz bio on IMDb 

American film directors
Living people
American male writers
Year of birth missing (living people)